Ooni Giesi was the 20th Ooni of Ife, a paramount traditional ruler of Ile Ife, the ancestral home of the Yorubas. He succeeded Ooni Ogboruu and was succeeded by  
Ooni Luwoo.

References

Oonis of Ife
Yoruba history